Branko Radović may refer to:
 Branko Radović (basketball) (1933–1993), Yugoslav basketball player and coach
 Branko Radović (footballer, born 1950), Montenegrin former footballer and the current manager
 Branko Radović (footballer, born 1993) (born 1993), Serbian footballer